Dinaraea aequata is a species of rove beetles native to Europe.

References

Staphylinidae
Beetles described in 1837
Beetles of Europe